Larry Dean Bucshon (born May 31, 1962) is an American politician and physician who has been the U.S. representative for  since 2011. He is a member of the Republican Party.

Early life, education, and early career 
Bucshon was born in Taylorville, Illinois on May 31, 1962, and raised in Kincaid, Illinois. His father, Ronald, was a coal miner, Navy serviceman, and lifelong Democrat; his mother, Barbara, was a nurse.

Bucshon graduated from the University of Illinois at Urbana-Champaign and got his medical degree from the University of Illinois Medical School at Chicago. After medical school, he completed a residency at the Medical College of Wisconsin, where he served as chief resident in surgery and remained there to complete a fellowship in cardiothoracic surgery. He also received training at the Milwaukee Veterans Affairs Hospital. During this time, he enlisted with the United States Navy Reserve, where he served for almost a decade.

Medical career 
Bucshon specialized in cardiothoracic surgery and has performed hundreds of heart surgeries. From 1995 to 1998, he was in private medical practice in Wichita, Kansas. Bucshon joined Ohio Valley HeartCare in 1998, where he served as the group's president. He was named St. Mary's Medical Staff Physician of the Year in 2007. He also served as Chief of Cardiothoracic Surgery and Medical Director of the open heart recovery intensive care unit at St. Mary's Hospital.

U.S. House of Representatives

Elections

2010 

Bucshon faced Democratic nominee State Representative Trent Van Haaften in the race to fill the seat vacated by Brad Ellsworth, who was running for Senate.

Bucshon received support from the National Republican Congressional Committee and was named a GOP Young Gun.  During the campaign, he was endorsed by several conservative interest groups and elected officials, including the Indiana Chamber of Commerce Congressional Action Committee, United States Chamber of Commerce, National Right to Life Committee, Indiana Right to Life, Indiana Manufacturers Association, Campaign for Working Families, House Minority Leader John Boehner, U.S. Congressman Mike Pence, and Indiana Governor Mitch Daniels. Bucshon received significant campaign contributions from medical groups.

Bucshon defeated van Haaften by 21 points, winning all 18 counties in the district.

2012
Bucshon defeated Kristi Risk again in the Republican primary. Bucshon had defeated Risk in the 2010 primary, 16,262 votes to 14,273.

In the general election, Bucshon defeated former state representative Dave Crooks.

2014
The conservative Club for Growth announced that it would target Bucshon for defeat in the 2014 Republican primary, but he was reelected.

Bucshon is a member of the Republican Main Street Partnership.

Tenure and political positions

Taxes and spending 

Bucshon voted for the Tax Cuts and Jobs Act of 2017. After voting, he said there would be "dramatic" economic growth that would "fully cover the amount of revenue decreases" from tax cuts. Buschon claimed that people would file their taxes on a postcard.

Bucshon supports lower corporate and individual taxes. He has called for freezing spending at 2008 levels, extending the Bush tax cuts for all income brackets, and reviewing all government programs for places to reduce spending. He has said that Republicans need to "first admit we were partially to blame for the increased government spending over the past decade." Bucshon supports simplifying the personal and corporate tax codes.

Bucshon voted for the Budget Control Act of 2011, which created a Joint Select Committee on Deficit Reduction. He also supported a balanced budget amendment that would require the federal government to spend no more than it collects in revenue each year. During his 2010 campaign, Bucshon said one of his campaign goals was to lower taxes for all Americans.

In 2010, Bucshon signed a pledge sponsored by Americans for Prosperity promising to vote against any global warming legislation that would raise taxes.

Health care 
Bucshon supports the repeal of the Affordable Health Care for America Act. He supports reforms that expand and reform high-risk pools and federal reinsurance programs and lower costs. Bucshon wants to increase transparency in medical care costs. He has called for cuts in health care programs.

Gun laws 
Bucshon, who calls himself "an ardent supporter of protecting the Second Amendment", has supported several bills that loosen restrictions on gun ownership. He co-sponsored the National Right-to-Carry Reciprocity Act of 2011, which requires all states to honor concealed carry permits from other states within their borders, irrespective of their own gun laws. The National Rifle Association and the Gun Owners of America have both given Bucshon an "A" rating.

Abortion 
Bucshon opposes abortion. During his time in Congress, he has supported bills that seek to establish a legal framework for challenging Roe v. Wade. He has said he believes that abortion should be legal in cases where the mother's life may be in danger. Bucshon co-sponsored the Life at Conception Act, which declares that life begins at the moment of conception and is entitled to legal protection from that point forward.

In October 2015, Bucshon was named to serve on the Select Investigative Panel on Planned Parenthood.

Social Security 
Bucshon supports a comprehensive strategy to ensure the long-term sustainability of Social Security for current and future beneficiaries.

Energy 
Bucshon calls himself a "long term friend of coal". His biggest contributors include Koch brothers and Murray energy. He supports the Keystone XL pipeline project.

Transportation 
On November 2, 2011, the Evansville Courier & Press reported that Bucshon planned to introduce an amendment to the transportation funding bill that would allow governors to reallocate federal transportation funding from designated programs to projects they designate as emergencies.

Federal grants 
On July 10, 2014, Bucshon introduced the Research and Development Efficiency Act, a bill that would instruct the Office of Science and Technology Policy to establish a working group under the authority of the National Science and Technology Council to review federal regulations affecting research and research universities and make recommendations on how to streamline them and reduce the regulatory burden on such researchers. Bucshon said his goal was "to alleviate some of the burden placed on our research universities so they can get back to their main goal of conducting basic science research."

Climate change 
During a September 17, 2014, hearing of the Committee on Science, Space and Technology, Bucshon was questioning John Holdren, Director of the White House Office of Science and Technology Policy. When Holdren encouraged Bucshon to read the scientific literature on global warming, Bucshon replied, "Of all the climatologists whose careers depend on the climate changing to keep themselves publishing articles -- yes, I could read that, but I don't believe it."

Cannabis 

Bucshon has a "D" rating from NORML for his voting history on cannabis-related causes. He opposes veterans having access to medical marijuana if recommended by their Veterans Health Administration doctor and if it is legal for medicinal purposes in their state of residence.

Committee assignments
 Committee on Energy and Commerce
 Subcommittee on Health
 Subcommittee on Environment and Economy
 Subcommittee on Oversight and Investigations

Caucus memberships
 Congressional Constitution Caucus
 Republican Study Committee
Republican Governance Group
Republican Main Street Partnership

Personal life 
Bucshon met his wife Kathryn, a practicing anesthesiologist in Evansville, during his medical residency. They now live in Newburgh with their four children. He is a member of Our Redeemer Lutheran Church (LCMS) in Evansville.

Electoral history

See also
 Physicians in the United States Congress

References

External links
 Congressman Larry Bucshon official U.S. House website
 Larry Bucshon for Congress
 
 
 

|-

1962 births
21st-century American politicians
American cardiac surgeons
American Lutherans
Living people
Lutherans from Indiana
Medical College of Wisconsin alumni
Military personnel from Indiana
People from Newburgh, Indiana
People from Taylorville, Illinois
Physicians from Indiana
University of Illinois Urbana-Champaign alumni
Republican Party members of the United States House of Representatives from Indiana